Gladau is a village and a former municipality in the Jerichower Land district, in Saxony-Anhalt, Germany. Since 1 July 2009, it is part of the town Genthin.

Former municipalities in Saxony-Anhalt
Jerichower Land